Nanjing Radio (Group), is a family of radio stations that serve the Nanjing China area.  It is also associated with the Nanjing Television Broadcast Group.

External links
 Official Website
 Official Website (translated to English with Babelfish)
 Source: Pinyin translated by Cozy Website

List of Nanjing radio stations
 Comprehensive News Channel (O1)
 Education Channel (O5)
 Film/Television Channel (O2)
 Literature Channel (O3)
 Lifestyle Channel (O4)
 Kids Channel (O7)
 Nanjing News (Xinwen) Channel (NJXWT)
 Nanjing Economy Channel (NJJJT1)
 Nanjing Sports Channel (NJJJT2)
 Nanjing Music (Yin Yue) Channel (NJYYT)
 Nanjing Traffic (Jiao Tong) Channel (NJJTT)

Mandarin-language radio stations
Mass media in Nanjing
Radio stations in China
Chinese-language radio stations